USS Muskogee (PF-49), a  in commission from 1944 to 1945, thus far has been the only ship of the United States Navy to be named for Muskogee, Oklahoma. She later served in the Soviet Navy as EK-19 and in the Republic of Korea Navy as ROKS Dumon (PF-61).

Construction and commissioning
Originally classified as a patrol gunboat, PG-157, Muskogee was reclassified as a patrol frigate, PF-49, on 15 April 1943. She was laid down on 18 September 1943, by Consolidated Steel Corporation at Wilmington, California, launched on 18 October 1943, sponsored by Mrs. S. B. Hudson, wife of the mayor of Muskogee, and commissioned on 16 March 1944.

Service history

US Navy, World War II, 1944-1945
After training and exercises off the California coast, Muskogee, manned by a United States Coast Guard crew, departed San Pedro, California, on 18 June 1944, for Nouméa, New Caledonia, where she arrived on 18 July 1944, for patrol and escort duty from Nouméa and, after its capture, Humboldt Bay, New Guinea. Anti-submarine patrol and screening for ships operating around New Guinea were her primary duties into October 1944. On 18 October 1944 she got underway screening the second reinforcement group bound for newly invaded Leyte in the Philippine Islands, arriving in San Pedro Bay on 24 October to screen transports and supply ships under numerous Japanese air attacks while waiting for a group of empty tank landing shipss to form up for the return passage. As her convoy retired on 26 October 1944, Japanese aircraft again attacked it, and Muskogee joined in downing several enemy aircraft. A second escort voyage to Leyte in early November 1944 was less eventful.

Concluding her New Guinea patrols, Muskogee arrived in Pearl Harbor, Territory of Hawaii, on 15 December 1944, then reported at Dutch Harbor, Territory of Alaska, on 12 January 1945 for similar duty in the Aleutian Islands. Selected for transfer to the Soviet Navy in Project Hula – a secret program for the transfer of U.S. Navy ships to the Soviet Navy at Cold Bay, Alaska, in anticipation of the Soviet Union joining the war against Japan – Muskogee departed Adak on 6 July 1945 bound for Seattle, Washington. After undergoing repairs and conversion at Seattle in preparation for her transfer, Muskogee steamed to Cold Bay, where she soon began training her new Soviet crew.

Soviet Navy, 1945–1949

Commissioned into the Soviet Navy immediately, Muskogee was designated as a storozhevoi korabl ("escort ship") and renamed EK-19 in Soviet service. She soon departed Cold Bay bound for Petropavlovsk-Kamchatsky in the Soviet Union, where she served as a patrol vessel in the Soviet Far East.

In February 1946, the United States began negotiations for the return of ships loaned to the Soviet Union for use during World War II. On 8 May 1947, United States Secretary of the Navy James V. Forrestal informed the United States Department of State that the United States Department of the Navy wanted 480 of the 585 combatant ships it had transferred to the Soviet Union for World War II use returned, EK-19 among them. Negotiations for the return of the ships were protracted, but on 1 November 1949 the Soviet Union finally returned EK-19 to the U.S. Navy at Yokosuka, Japan.

Republic of Korea Navy, 1950- ? 
Reverting to her original name, Muskogee lay idle in the Pacific Reserve Fleet at Yokosuka until the United States loaned her to the Republic of Korea on 23 October 1950. Commissioned into the Republic of Korea Navy as ROKS Dumon (PF-61), she saw service in the Korean War. The U.S. Navy struck the ship from the Naval Vessel Register on 15 September 1972 and the United States transferred her outright to South Korea under the Security Assistance Program on 1 October 1973. Her final disposition is unknown.

Awards
The US Navy awarded Muskogee one battle star for her World War II service.

References

External links 
 
hazegray.org: USS Muskogee

 

Tacoma-class frigates
1943 ships
World War II frigates and destroyer escorts of the United States
Tacoma-class frigates of the Soviet Navy
World War II frigates of the Soviet Union
Cold War frigates of the Soviet Union
Tacoma-class frigates of the Republic of Korea Navy
Korean War frigates of South Korea
Ships transferred under Project Hula